Andrei Vladimirovich Panyukov (born 25 September 1994) is a Russian professional footballer who plays as a striker.

Career
Panyukov made his debut in the Russian Premier League on 21 July 2012 for FC Dynamo Moscow in a game vs FC Volga Nizhny Novgorod.

He was the top scorer of the Under-21 Russian Premier League competition of Spring 2012, scoring 13 goals in 13 games.

On 31 October 2012, he scored his first goal for the main Dynamo squad, giving them a 2–1 victory over FC Khimki in the 2012–13 Russian Cup Round of 16 game.

Panyukov joined FC Khimki on loan for the second part of 2012–13 season.

He scored his first league goal for Dynamo on 18 August 2013, giving them an equalizer with 7 minutes left to play in an away game vs FC Krasnodar (the game ended 1–1).

For the second part of 2013–14 season Panyukov went on loan to PFC Spartak Nalchik.

Atlantas
Panyukov joined Lithuanian A Lyga contenders Atlantas on loan before 2015 season. According to his agent, he chose Lithuanian club due to possibility to get a lot of playing time and be team leader.

He quickly managed to adapt in his new side and was lethal in front scoring 11 goals in the first round of the league becoming Player of the Round.

After his contract with Dynamo Moscow expired Andrei choose to stay in Lithuania and signed one-year deal with Atlantas. Later he extended contract with the club until the end of 2018.

AC Ajaccio
For the 2015–16 season, Panyukov joined Ajaccio on loan, with an option to buy.

Braga
Panyukov was loaned to the Portuguese club S.C. Braga before the 2016–17 season, with an buy-out option. However, he only made 6 appearances for Braga B and none for the main squad, and on 30 January 2017, the club announced that his loan has been terminated.

Atlantas
Andrei Panyukov joins again his former club FK Atlantas for six months before to sign in Russian Premier League with Zenit FC. He scores 11 goals in 14 matches.

Zenit
On 10 August 2017, he returned to Russia, signing a 3-year contract with FC Zenit Saint Petersburg.

Ural Yekaterinburg
On 9 August 2018, he joined FC Ural Yekaterinburg on loan for the 2018–19 season. On 29 September 2018, he scored 2 goals after coming on as a substitute to secure a 2–1 comeback victory for Ural over FC Arsenal Tula. Following the loan, on 27 June 2019 he moved to Ural on a permanent basis. On 11 January 2022, Panyukov was loaned to Kyzylzhar in Kazakhstan until 3 December 2022. On 22 June 2022, Panyukov's contract with Ural was terminated by mutual consent.

Career statistics

Club

Honours

Individual 
CIS Cup top goalscorer: 2013

References

External links
 
 

1994 births
Footballers from Moscow
Living people
Russian footballers
Russia youth international footballers
Russia under-21 international footballers
Association football forwards
FC Dynamo Moscow players
FC Khimki players
PFC Spartak Nalchik players
FC Baltika Kaliningrad players
FK Atlantas players
AC Ajaccio players
S.C. Braga B players
FC Zenit Saint Petersburg players
FC Zenit-2 Saint Petersburg players
FC Ural Yekaterinburg players
FC Kyzylzhar players
FC Veles Moscow players
Russian Premier League players
Russian First League players
A Lyga players
Ligue 2 players
Championnat National 3 players
Liga Portugal 2 players
Kazakhstan Premier League players
Russian expatriate footballers
Expatriate footballers in Lithuania
Russian expatriate sportspeople in Lithuania
Expatriate footballers in France
Russian expatriate sportspeople in France
Expatriate footballers in Portugal
Russian expatriate sportspeople in Portugal
Expatriate footballers in Kazakhstan
Russian expatriate sportspeople in Kazakhstan